Section 127 may refer to:

Australia
Section 127 of the Constitution of Australia (repealed 1967), excluding Indigenous Australians from population counts

United Kingdom
Section 127 of the Communications Act 2003, prohibiting "grossly offensive, indecent, obscene or menacing" electronic communications
Section 127 of the Magistrates' Courts Act 1980, establishing a six-month limitation period for summary offences